The following is a list of hospitals in Gampaha District, Sri Lanka. The biggest government hospitals in the district, known as line ministry hospitals, are controlled by the  central government in Colombo. All other government hospitals in the district are controlled by the provincial government in Colombo.

Government hospitals

Central government hospitals

Teaching hospitals
 Colombo North Teaching Hospital, Ragama
 National Hospital for Respiratory Diseases (Welisara Chest Hospital), Welisara
 Rheumtology and Rehabilitation Hospital, Ragama

Divisional hospitals (type A)
 Kandana Divisional Hospital, Kandana

Primary medical care units
 Vijaya Kumaratunga Memorial Hospital, Seeduwa

Other central government hospitals
 Air Force Hospital, SLAF Katunayake, Katunayake
 Mahara Prison Hospital, Mahara

Provincial government hospitals

District general hospitals
 Gampaha District General Hospital, Gampaha
 Negombo District General Hospital (Negombo Base Hospital), Negombo

Base hospitals (type A)
 Wathupitiwala Base Hospital, Wathupitiwala

Base hospitals (type B)
 Kiribathgoda District Hospital, Kelaniya
 Mirigama Base Hospital, Mirigama

Divisional hospitals (type A)
 Divulapitiya Divisional Hospital, Divulapitiya
 Dompe Divisional Hospital, Dompe
 Minuwangoda Divisional Hospital, Minuwangoda

Divisional hospitals (type B)
 Radawana Divisional Hospital, Radawana

Divisional hospitals (type C)
 Akaragama Divisional Hospital, Akaragama
 Ja-Ela Divisional Hospital, Ja-Ela
 Pamunugama Divisional Hospital, Pamunugama

Private hospitals
 Arogya Hospital, Gampaha
 Ave Maria Hospital, Negombo
 Bandaranayake Hospital, Wathupitiwala
 Cooperative Hospital, Gampaha
 Dissanayeke Hospital, Negombo
 Hemas Hospital, Wattala
 Ja-Ela Ragama Hospitals (Pvt) Ltd, Ja-Ela
 Leesons Hospital, Ragama
 Melsta Hospital, Ragama
 Nawaloka Hospital, Negombo
 Nawaloka Medicare, Gampaha
 Negombo Health Care Private Hospital, Negombo
 Peoples Hospital, Mahabage
 Radiant Eye Hospital, Ja-Ela
 Sethma Hospital, Gampaha
 Sirisanda Hospital, Nittambuwa
 St. George's Hospital, Biyagama
 St. Josephs Hospital, Negombo
 Suwa Sewana Hospital, Yakkala
 Viweka Hospital, Veyangoda

See also
 List of hospitals in Sri Lanka

References
 
 
 

Gampaha
Gampaha